Jili may refer to:

 Jili, Liuyang, Hunan Province, People's Republic of China
 Jili District, Luoyang, China
 Jili language, a Plateau language of Nigeria
 Jili language (Burma)
 King Ji of Zhou, personal name Jili
 Geely, a Chinese car company
 Stanley Tong, Hong Kong film action choreographer

See also
 Ji Li (disambiguation)